This page provides summaries for the 1983 CFU Championship.

Qualifying tournament

Group 1

First round

Both matches were played in Barbados due to political unrest in Surinam

Second round

Group 2

First round

It is unknown whether the return round was ever played or not.

Second round
Fixture:  vs . Martinique won; no results known.

Group 3

First round

Second round

Group 4

First round
Jamaica advance after Puerto Rico withdrew

Second round
Saint Kitts & Nevis advance after Jamaica withdrew

Qualifying play-offs
The winner of each group advanced to the play-offs

 Martinique, Antigua and Barbuda qualified to the finals
 Trinidad and Tobago qualified as holders; French Guiana qualified as hosts

Final tournament
All matches were played in Cayenne, French Guiana

References
RSSSF archives

Caribbean Cup
1983 in CONCACAF football
International sports competitions hosted by French Guiana
Football competitions in French Guiana
1983 in French Guiana